Calligrapha scalaris, the elm calligrapha, is a species of leaf beetle in the family Chrysomelidae. It is found in North America.

Subspecies
These two subspecies belong to the species Calligrapha scalaris:
 Calligrapha scalaris floridana Schaeffer
 Calligrapha scalaris scalaris

References

Further reading

External links

 

Chrysomelinae
Articles created by Qbugbot
Beetles described in 1824